Phelpsiella is a group of plants in the family Rapateaceae described as a genus in 1958.

The only known species is Phelpsiella ptericaulis, endemic to the Cerro Parú of Amazonas State in southern Venezuela.

References

Monotypic Poales genera
Rapateaceae
Endemic flora of Venezuela